The Advance Omega is a series of Swiss single-place, paragliders, designed and produced by Advance Thun of Thun.

Design and development
The Omega was designed as the competition glider in the company's line.

The design has progressed through many generations of models, from the original Omega, through the Omega 2, 3, 4, 5, 6, 7, 8 to the Omega XAlps, each improving on the last. The models are each named for their rough wing area in square metres.

The Omega XAlps variant was developed as a specially lightened model, for cross country bivouac flying, involving flying, camping and hiking.

Operational history
The Omega XAlps was flown by Chrigel Maurer and Sebastian Huber in the 2015 Red Bull X-Alps competition. They flew  over seven days and placed first and second respectively.

Variants
Omega 5 24
Small-sized model for lighter pilots. The glider model is DHV 2-3 and AFNOR certified.
Omega 5 27
Mid-sized model for medium-weight pilots. The glider model is DHV 2-3 and AFNOR certified.
Omega 5 30
Large-sized model for heavier pilots. The glider model is DHV 2-3 and AFNOR certified.
Omega 7 24
Small-sized model for lighter pilots. Glide ratio is 10:1.
Omega 7 26
Mid-sized model for medium-weight pilots. Glide ratio is 10:1.
Omega 7 28
Mid-sized model for medium-weight pilots. Glide ratio is 10:1.
Omega 7 30
Large-sized model for heavier pilots. Glide ratio is 10:1.
Omega 8 23
Small-sized model for lighter pilots.
Omega 8 25
Mid-sized model for medium-weight pilots.
Omega 8 27
Mid-sized model for medium-weight pilots.
Omega 8 29
Large-sized model for heavier pilots.
Omega XAlps 22
Small-sized model for lighter pilots. The glider model is EN/LTF D certified.
Omega XAlps 24
Large-sized model for heavier pilots. The glider model is EN/LTF D certified.

Specifications (Omega 5 24)

References

External links

Omega
Paragliders